Saidkent is a rural locality (Selo) in Kasumkentsky Selsoviet, Suleyman-Stalsky District, Republic of Dagestan, Russia. The population was 1,007 as of 2010. There are 24 streets.

Geography 
Saidkent is located on the right bank of the Chiragchay River, 190 kilometers southeast of Makhachkala and 3 kilometers northwest of Kasumkent (the district's administrative centre) by road. Kasumkent is the nearest rural locality.

References 

Rural localities in Suleyman-Stalsky District